Elkjøp, better known as Elgiganten outside Norway, is the largest consumer electronics retailer in the Nordic Countries with four hundred stores in six countries and 10,000 employees. Elkjøp was founded by Trygve Fjetland on 16 March 1962. It was purchased in November 1999 by Currys plc. Elkjøp owned stores for a time in the Czech Republic and Slovakia. 

The coined name Elkjøp translates from Norwegian as El purchase, where El is understood as shorthand for elektrisk (“electric”) or elektronisk (“electronic”).

Operations
Elkjøp currently trades under several different brands:

References

External links
 Norwegian site
 Finnish site
 Swedish site
 Danish site
 Icelandic site
 Faroese site
 Dixons Group plc financial highlights for 2003-2004

Companies based in Lørenskog
Companies formerly listed on the Oslo Stock Exchange
Consumer electronics retailers
Currys plc
Norwegian brands
Norwegian companies established in 1962
Retail companies established in 1962
Retail companies of Norway
Wholesalers of Norway